Le traquenard (1915) is a French crime silent film starring Fernand Mailly, Irène Bordoni and Jacques Grétillat.

Film Preservation 
No sources indicate if a copy survives or not.

1915 films
1915 crime films
French silent films
French black-and-white films
French crime films
1910s French films